Diosmany Santana is a paralympic athlete from Cuba competing mainly in category T12 distance running events.

Diosmany competed in the 2000 Summer Paralympics winning a bronze medal in the 5000m and a silver medal in the 10000m.

References

Paralympic athletes of Cuba
Athletes (track and field) at the 2000 Summer Paralympics
Paralympic silver medalists for Cuba
Paralympic bronze medalists for Cuba
Living people
Medalists at the 2000 Summer Paralympics
Year of birth missing (living people)
Paralympic medalists in athletics (track and field)
Cuban male long-distance runners
Visually impaired long-distance runners
Paralympic long-distance runners